() is a municipality and village in Frýdek-Místek District in the Moravian-Silesian Region of the Czech Republic. It has about 1,400 inhabitants.

Polish minority makes up 26.0% of the population.

Etymology
The name of the village is derived from buk, i.e. "beech". It refers to the beech forests that grew there.

Geography
Bukovec is the easternmost municipality of the country and the first municipality in the Czech Republic through which the Olza River flows. It lies in the historical region of Cieszyn Silesia.

History

Bukovec was established by Casimir I, Duke of Cieszyn in 1353. The settlement initially served as an economic base for the local guardhouse on the southeastern border of the Duchy of Teschen. After 200 years, the village gained a farming-pasture character. The number of inhabitants rose very slowly. By 1647, only 20 people lived there. Settlers had many children and soon the population grew to 100.

After Revolutions of 1848 in the Austrian Empire a modern municipal division was introduced in the re-established Austrian Silesia. The village as a municipality was subscribed to the political district of Cieszyn and the legal district of Jablunkov. According to the censuses conducted in 1880–1910 the population of the municipality grew from 844 in 1880 to 1,071 in 1910 with the majority being native Polish-speakers (between 97.7% and 99.9%) accompanied by German-speaking (at most 19 or 2% in 1890) and Czech-speaking people (at most 3 or 0.3% in 1890). In terms of religion in 1910 the majority were Roman Catholics (92.7%), followed by Protestants (7.3%).

After World War I, Polish–Czechoslovak War and the division of Cieszyn Silesia in 1920, it became a part of Czechoslovakia. Following the Munich Agreement, in October 1938 together with the Zaolzie region it was annexed by Poland, administratively adjoined to Cieszyn County of Silesian Voivodeship. It was then annexed by Nazi Germany at the beginning of World War II. After the war it was restored to Czechoslovakia.

From 1975 to 1990 Bukovec was an administrative part of Jablunkov. Since 1990, it has been a separate municipality.

Sights
The Church of the Asumption of the Blessed Virgin Mary was built in 1938–1939.

References

External links

Villages in Frýdek-Místek District
Cieszyn Silesia